The 2010 Phillip Island Superbike World Championship round was the first round of the 2010 Superbike World Championship season. It took place over the weekend of 26–28 February 2010, at the Phillip Island Grand Prix Circuit near Cowes, Victoria, Australia.

Results

Superbike race 1 classification

Superbike race 2 classification

Supersport race classification

References
 Superbike qualifying

External links
 The official website of the Phillip Island Grand Prix Circuit
 The official website of the Superbike World Championship

Philip Island
Motorsport at Phillip Island
Superbike World Championship round
February 2010 sports events in Australia